Christopher Burke is an independent Dublin City Councillor and former Lord Mayor of Dublin.

Burke sided with the Provisional Irish Republican Army in the 1970 split in Sinn Féin and the IRA. He served two prison sentences in Portlaoise Prison on IRA membership charges in the 1970s. By his own account, Burke rejoined the IRA upon leaving prison.

In the early 1980s he became involved in local politics. He was involved in anti-illegal drug trade activism in Dublin, particularly with Concerned Parents Against Drugs, and criticised the Garda Síochána for their treatment of his fellow activists. He was first elected to Dublin City Council in 1985.

In 1986, he and Tony Gregory were jailed for fourteen days for campaigning on behalf of Moore Street traders.

In 1996, he was awarded £7,500 for the distress caused by false statements after a member of the Garda Special Branch had told Burke he was in danger of being assassinated.

He was involved in negotiations during the Northern Ireland peace process in the 1990s and supported the IRA ceasefires.

After winning a seat for Sinn Féin in the 2009 Irish local elections, he left the party three days later, leading to criticism from Aengus Ó Snodaigh that Sinn Féin had promoted him in the campaign as its longest-serving councillor.

In 2010, the Sunday World newspaper was forced by the High Court to apologise to Burke for a May 2007 article by crime reporter Paul Williams, published during the campaigning period for that year's general election, that falsely accused him of knowing a criminal by the name of Christy Griffin, as well as accusing of him of lying about knowing Griffin.

He ran for the Dáil ten times in Dublin Central from 1982 until 2020 but was not elected. In June 2014 he was elected Lord Mayor of Dublin for a year.

References

 

Living people
Independent politicians in Ireland
Lord Mayors of Dublin
Year of birth missing (living people)
Provisional Irish Republican Army members
Sinn Féin politicians